The Philippines supports a rich and varied flora with close botanical connections to Indonesia and mainland Southeast Asia. Forests cover almost one-half of the land area and are typically tropical, with the dominant family, Dipterocarpaceae, representing 75% of the stands. The forest also has vines, epiphytes, and climbers. Open grasslands, ranging up to 2.4 m (8 ft) in height, occupy one-fourth of the land area; they are man- made, the aftermath of the slash-and-burn agricultural system, and most contain tropical savanna grasses that are nonnutritious and difficult to eradicate. The diverse flora includes 8,000 species of flowering plants, 1,000 kinds of ferns, and 800 species of orchids.

Seventy to eighty percent of non-flying mammals in the Philippines are found nowhere else in the world.
Common mammals include the wild hog, deer, wild carabao, monkey, civet cat, and various rodents. There are about 196 breeding species of birds, among the more numerous being the megapodes (turkey-like wildfowl), button quail, jungle fowl, peacock pheasant, dove, pigeon, parrot, and hornbill. Reptilian life is represented by 190 species; there are crocodiles and the larger snakes include the python and several varieties of cobra.

The fauna on Bohol is almost identical to that on Mindanao, Samar, and Leyte, but not that on nearby Negros. Scientists believe that the floral and faunal biodiversity unique to the Philippines is caused by the Ice Age. They also believe that the country has the most severely endangered plant and animal communities on earth.

Bohol is an island province in the Philippines and its 10th largest island. It is located in the Central Visayas region and has a population of 1,137,000 (2000 census) with an area of 4,117.3 km.
This is a list of the most common species and varieties of flora and fauna specific to the province of Bohol in the Philippines, endemic or otherwise.

List of Bohol Flora

Hardwood and other tree species
 abihíd-Spondias pinnata
 Acacia – Rain tree; Samanea saman Merr.; Other scientific names: Mimosa saman Jacq.; Inga saman Willd.; Pithecolobium saman Benth.; Enterolobium saman Prain
 almáciga – Agathis philippinensis
 bagakay
 Bagalñga (C. Bis.) – Lygodium japonicum; Paraiso Bagalunga – Melia dubia
  bago-Gnetum gnemon
 balete – India rubber tree; Ficus elastica
 bánaba – Lagerstroemia speciosa; queen's flower or crepe myrtle and the pride of India;
 bangkal – Nauclea orientalis; Leichhardt tree, yellow cheesewood
 bangkaw – Nauclea subdita; bulobangkal, bongkol
 Batinô – Alstonia macrophylla
 bitaóg – Calophyllkum blancoi;  Calophyllum wallichianum Vidal
 bujangjang – Prayer beads; Arbus precatorius Linn.; saga
 bulí – Corypha elata Roxb.;  buri
 kawayan – Bambusa spinosa; Bambusa vulgaris
 dapdap  – Erythrina variegata Linn. var. orientalis (Linn.); Indian coal tree
 Date palm –  Palmae (INTRODUCED)
 dorol – also called doldol; kapok (Tag.) ; Ceiba pentandra
 Eucalyptus – Eucalyptus globulus (INTRODUCED)
 Gemilina – Gmelina arborea (INTRODUCED)
 Ipil-ipil – Leucaena leucocephala Linn. (INTRODUCED)
 lauaan – Diptecarpus thurifer white lauan – Shorea contorta
 lubí – niyóg – Coconut – Cocos nucifera
 madre de cacao – kakawate; Gliricidia sepium (INTRODUCED)
 mahogany – Philippine Mahogany; Swietenia mahagoni (Meliaceae) (INTRODUCED)
   mangga – Mango; Mangifera indica (Anacardiaceae); Bohol mangga
 mangrove – Rhizophora mangle; red mangrove; pagatpat; manggal
 mangrove – Avicennia nitida; black mangrove
 mangrove – Sonneratia
 mangrove – Brugiera;  red mangrove
 mangrove – bakhawan babae-Rhizophora mucronata; bakhawan lalake-Rhizophora apiculata
 mangrove – piyapî
 mangrove – piyag-aw; bigî or tabigi; Xylocarpus moluccensis
 mangrove – Bigî (Tagb.); Tabigi-Xylocarpus granatum
 maribojoc – agoho; Casuarina equisitofolia
 molave – Vitex parviflora; tugás
 narra – Philippine cedar; Pterocarpus indicus; Pterocarpus santalinus
 Neem tree – Azadirachta indica (INTRODUCED)
 ninô or linô – Indian mulberry; Morinda citrifolia; apatot (noni juice)
 nipâ – Nypa fruticans;  nipâ palm
 nitô – Lygodium japonicum
 oliva – olive; Cycas revoluta
 pitogo – Cycas
 papuwá – annatto; Bixa orellana Linn.; suetes; atsuete (INTRODUCED)
 rattan – Calamus
 Rubber tree – Hevea brasiliensis (Euphorbiaceae) (INTRODUCED)
 teak – Philippine teak; Tectona philippinensis
 tipó – Antipolo; Artocarpus blancoi Merr.
 talisay – Terminalia catappa; almond
 yakál – Dipterocarpus  plagutus-Shorea astylosa

Note: very highly regulated species in the Philippines: lauaan, narra, Philippine mahogany

Fruit trees/plants 
 alibangbang – Bauhinia malabarica; butterfly-shaped leaves from a tree used for souring
 atis – sugar apple; Annona squamosa Linn.; anonas (INTRODUCED)
 Avocado – Persea americana; avocado (INTRODUCED)
 balingbing – star fruit; Averrhoa carambola Linn.; also Averrhoa pentandra Blanco (INTRODUCED)
 batuan – Garcinia morella, a small sour green fruit with a large seed
 bayabas – Guava; Psidium guajava (INTRODUCED)
 boongon – pomelo; Citrus maxima
 bugnay – Antidesma bunius Linn.; bignay
 cacao – Theobroma cacao (INTRODUCED)
 kapeng barako – Philippine coffee; Coffea arabica; Coffea canephora or C. robusta (INTRODUCED)
 kaimito – caimito; Chrysophyllum caninito Linn.; star apple (INTRODUCED)
 chico – Achras sapota Linn.; Sapota achras Mill.; Sapota zapotilla Coville (INTRODUCED)
 chico- Manilkara zapote, a brown sweet fruit with black seeds (INTRODUCED)
 Chinese holly – Ilex cornuta (INTRODUCED)
 Curcuma domestica, turmeric (INTRODUCED)
 dayáp – Citrus aurantifolia, lime (INTRODUCED)
 duhat – Syzygium cumini, Java plum
 durian – Durio zibethinus
 granada – Punica granatum; Pomegranate (INTRODUCED)
 guyabano – Soursop; Annona muricata Linnaeus or A. muricata L. (Annonaceae); guyabano
 ibâ – Averrhoa bilimbi; kamias
 joló; koló – bread fruit; Artocarpus altilis
 kamátsile – Pithecellobium dulce, kamachille, Madras thorn fruit
 kapayas or kapajas – Papaya; Carica papaya L. (Caricaceae) (INTRODUCED)
 kasúy – Anacardium occidentale, cashew (INTRODUCED)
 lanzones – Lansium parasiticum
 lemoncito – × Citrofortunella microcarpa,  kalamansi a small lime indigenous to the Philippines; also called Calamondin, Chinese orange, Panama orange
 linga – Sesamum  indicum
  lomboy – black plum; Syzygium cumini; duhat in Tagalog
 macopa – Syzygium samarangense
 mangga – mango ; Mangifera indica (carabao, pajo)
 manzanitas – datiles; ratiles; Muntingia calabura; a little cherry-like wild fruit (INTRODUCED)
 marang – Artocarpus odoratissima
 nangkâ – Jackfruit; Artocarpus heterophyllus Lam.; langkâ (INTRODUCED)
 orange – Citrus aurantium;  local orange; dalandan in Tagalog (INTRODUCED)
 orange – Mandarin orange; Citrus reticulata (INTRODUCED)
 orange – tangerine orange; Citrus nobilis ;dalandan (INTRODUCED)
 orange – local lemon or lime – Citrus; dayap in Tagalog (INTRODUCED)
 orange – Citrus medica (INTRODUCED)
 passion fruit – Passiflora incarnata (INTRODUCED)
 pili nut – Canarium ovatum
 pinya or pinja – Pineapple; Ananas comosus
saging tundan – Banana; Musa; (Musaceae)
 Saging sab-a – Banana variety; Musa (Musaceae)
 Saging cavendish; Banana variety; Musa (Musaceae)
 Saging senyorita; Banana variety; Musa (Musaceae)
 Saging morado
 sambag – Tamarindus indica; tamarind; sampalok (INTRODUCED)
 Santol –  Sandoricum koetjape Merr. (INTRODUCED)
 siriguelas; sineguelas in Visayan or sigarilyas in Tagalog Spondias sp
 suwâ-suwâ – Triphasia trifolia P. Wils.
 tambis – Syzygium malaccense; Malay apple;  Tersana rose apple
 tisâ
 Tree fern – Cyathea spp. spp.
 watermelon – Curcubita citrullus Linn.;  also Citrullus vulgaris Schrad.; pakwan (INTRODUCED)

Vegetables
 ahos – Garlic; Allium sativum; bawang
 Alugbati – Malabar nightshade; Basella rubra Linn.
 batong – string beans; Bataw;  Dolichos labiab Linn.
 carrot – karot; Daucus carota L.
 kabasâ – kalabasâ; squash; Cucurbita maxima Duchesne; Curcubita sulcata Blanco
 kamatis – Tomato; Solanum lycopersicum or Lycopersicum esculentum
 kamunggay – malunggay; Moringa oleifera
 katuray – Sesbania grandiflora, a white flower used in salads
 kinstsay – Apium graveolens, Chinese celery
 kolis – Pisonia alba, lettuce tree, also called maluko in Tagalog
 kulitis – Amaranthus viridis, slender amaranth
 kundol – Benicasa hispida; wax gourd
 kutsay – Allium odorum; Chinese chives
 Lagundî; Vitex negundo
 laurel – Antidesma bunius; Chinese laurel
 luy-a – ginger; Zingiber officinale; luya
 munggos –  munggo; Phaseolus aureus; green mung bean
 mustasa – Brassica juncea v. integrifola; mustard greens
 okra – Abelmoschus escuclentus Linn.; also Hibiscus esculentis Linn.
 pandan -Pandanus odoratissimus; screw pine
 paliyá or palijá – Bitter melon; Momordica charantia; Ampalaya
 patola – Luffa cylindrica; sponge gourd
 patola – Luffa acutangula; Loofah
 pechay – Brassica chinensis; pakchoy; bokchoy
 pipino – cucumber; Cucumis sativus
  pipino – Cucumber; zucchini; Cucurbita pepo
 radish; Raphanus
 repolyo – cabbage; Brassica oleracea
 saluyot – Corchorus olitorius; Jew's mallow
 sayote – Sechium edule; chayote; mirliton pear
 sibuyas bombay – Onion; Allium cepa
 sibuyas dahon – Allium sativum
 sili – Capsicum annuum; chili
 sili'ng kulikot – Capsicum frutescens; siling labuyo; Cayenne
 sili- pepper; Solanum capsicum (Solanaceae)
 singkamas – Pachyrhizus erosus; yambean
 tangkong or kangkong; Ipomoea aquatica; swamp cabbage, potato vine
 tawong or talong; eggplant – Solanum melongena
 Ocimum sanctum – holy basil
 upo – Lagenaria leucantha; bottle gourd
 Corindrium sativum – coriander leaf

Flowering plants
 adelfa – Oleander; South sea rose; Nerium indicum Mill.; Neroum oleander Blanco; Nerium odorum Soland.
 alas kuwatro
 antuwanga – gumamela;  hibiscus; China rose; shoeflower; Hibiscus rosa sinensis
 Asparagus (genus) – green fern, for bouquets; Asparagus plumosus
 Aster
 bahug-bahug – Vernonia cinerea; bulak-manok; billy goat weed
 banaba  – Lagerstroemia speciosa
 bangka-bangkaan – Rhoeo discolor
 bird of paradise (plant) – Strelitzia reginae
 bombil – bougainvillea; Bougainvillea
 Bromeliad
 bunga – Areca nut; Areca catechu;  Areca alba (lubi lubi)
 caballero – peacock flower; Caesalpinia pulcherrima Linn.;  bulaklak ng paraiso
 Comfrey – Symphytum officinale L (tambal sa nuka)
 cosmos – Cosmos (genus)
 cosmos (bahô) – Tagetes erecta
 Chrysanthemum – Chrysanthemum sinense; manzanilla
 daisy
 dancing lady
 dandelion- Taraxacum officinale Weber; Leontodon taraxacum Linn.; Taraxacum dens-leonis Desf.
 Dendrobium
 duranta – "Duranta repens Linn."; golden duranta
 Ginseng
 ground orchids
 ilang ilang – also known as Ylang-ylang; Cananga odorata
 Japanese rose – Rosa rugosa
 kalachuchi – frangipani; Plumeria; Plumiera rubra
 kataká-taká – Kalanchoe pinnata (synonym: Bryophyllum pinnatum)
 kalanchoe – Kalanchoe sp.
 kamantigi – mantigi;  Touch me not; Impatiens balsamina
 kutsaritas – Althernanthera sp.; (Amaranthaceae)
 kulitis – Amaranthus spinosus; uray
 kumintang – also tsitsirika; rosy periwinkle; Catharanthus roseus
  lirio – Crinum latifolim Linn.
 Maiden's hair plant – Chlorodesmis sp.
 Marigold – Calendula
 mayana or majana – Coleus sp.; Coleus blumei
  Million flower
 pamintâ – Piper nigrum;  black pepper
 pandong pandong – Celosia cristata Linn.; cock's comb
 Paragayo – san francisco
 Poinsettia – Euphorbia pulcherrima
 quiapo – kiapo; water cabbage; Pistia stratiotes
 rosál – Gardenia jasminioides; gardenia
  rose – rose; Genus: Rosa
 sabila – Aloe vera
 sagisi – Anahaw
 sagusahis – used as sandpaper for desks
 sampaguita – Jasmine; Jasminum sambac Linn.
 santal ?
 santan – Ixora sp.
 sunflower – Helianthus annuus
 tsampaka – Michelia champaca
 Verbena – Verbena officinalis
 violeta – bayolota; violets; Viola odorata L.
 waling-waling- Vanda
 yellow bell – kampanilya; Allamanda cathartica

Bohol endemic species
 Arygyreia boholensis (Convolvulaceae)
 Blumea stenophylla (Labiatae)
 Dendrocalamus sp.- large bamboos; kawayan
 Dischidias (Asclepiadaceae)
 Hoyas
 Imperata cylindrica
 Ixora littoralis (Rubiaceae)
 Macrosolena mcgregorii (Loranthaceae)
 Saccharum spontaneum
 Several Compositae
  lukdo – ferns
Source:

Grasses/Herbs/Weeds
 abacá  – Musa textilis; Manila Hemp
 acapulco – Cassia alata
 amor seco – Andropogon aciculatus
 bahô-bahô- Utot-utot; koronitas; kantutay; Lantana camara
 bilâ bilâ –  Eleusine indica
 bugáng – talahib; Saccharum spontaneum
 butones butones – Cyperus rotundus
 cogon – kogon;  Imperata cylindrica
 Euphorbia hirta
 fern 1 – Athyrium esculentum;  pako
 fern 2 – bird's nest fern; Asplenium nidus
 fern 3 – Drynaria quercifolia
 gulasiman – Portulaca oleracea
 hibî-hibî – makahiya; Mimosa pudica
 humay – rice; Oryza sativa; palay
 kana (Bis.) – Cardiospermum halicacabum; Heart Pea;  Balloon Vine 
 kanding-kanding – Stachytarpheta jamaicensis
 maís – corn
 Oregano – Origanum vulgare; wild marjoram, mountain mint, origanum, wintersweet and winter marjoram
 oregano – Coleus aromaticus Benth.
 peppermint – Mentha piperita
 Quisqualis indica – Chinese honeysuckle; "niyog-niyogan"
 sábila – Aloe vera;
 Sambong- Blumea camphora ; Blumea balsamifera
 sinaw sinaw or sida sida – ulasimang Bato; Peperomia pellucida; pansit-pansitan
 tangad or tanglad – lemon grass; Cymbopogon citratus; Cymbopogon spp.
 tawá tawá – Euphorbia hirta; boto-botonis; gatas-gatas
 tubó – sugar cane; Saccharum officinarum
 tubá-tubá – Jatropha curcas; also known as tubang bakod in Tagalog; Physic Nut in English or interchangeably tubá-tubá or Jatropha (Tuba-Tuba Plant Seeds (Jatropha) to Bio-diesel Fuel)
 tsaang gubat – Ehretia microphylla;
 yerba buena – Mentha spicata

Root crops
 apale
 balanghoy – Cassava; Manihot esculenta Crantz; kamoteng kahoy
 camote – Sweet potatoes; Ipomoea batatas
 gabi – taro; Colocasia esculenta Linn.
 patatas – potatoes; Solanum tuberosum
 singkamas – Pachyrrhizus erosus Linn.
 Ube kinampay – purple yam; Dioscorea alata
 Ube- yam; Dioscorea alata
 other cash crops

Seaweeds
 Acetabularia
 ambáng
 Chlorella
 Codium fragile
  eelgrasses – seagrasses; thalasia
 guaman – Gracilaria compressa
 gusô – Eucheuma spinosum
 kelp – Macrocystis
 Laminaria
 latô – Caulerpa racemosa
 Laurencia
 lukót
 Porphyra
 Samô – Sargassum
 Ulothrix
 Ulva –  sea lettuce

Gallery of some Bohol Flora

List of Bohol Fauna

Mammals
 baka – Philippine cow; Bos taurus
 Baboy ihás – baboy damó; wild boar; Sus scrofa
 bóngcaras – sea cow; Dugong dugon 
 dugong – manatee;  Trichechus Linnaeus, 1758
 kabaw – kalabaw; Carabao; Bubalus bubalis carabanesis
 mawmag, mamag, tarsius – Philippine tarsier; Tarsius syrichta
 Kwaknit or kabog  – bats ;  order Chiroptera
 Kagwang – Philippine flying lemur; Cynocephalus volans
 Sigbin – kangaroo ?
 unggoy – monkey; macaque; Philippine long-tailed macaque; Macaca fascicularis philippinensis
 monkeys
 milô, musang – common palm civet; Paradoxurus hermaphroditus

Annelid
 alimátok – Leech; Hirudo medicinalis
 earthworm; Lumbricus terrestris

Arthropods
 Centipede Class Chilopoda locally known as ulhipan
 labód- Millipede ; Class Diplopoda

Reptiles
 Python; Python reticulatus; reticulated python
 iyón or iwón – Philippine turtle;  Chelonia
 ahas – snake
 baksan
 hawo – bayawak; monitor lizard;  Varanus salvator
 Tikî or tabilí – house lizard;
 Tukô – Gecko gecko
 tawoto (taloto)
 ibid
 buaya
 baki
 ambubukad
 cobra

Birds (Ibon)
 agul-ol
 banog
 Antolihaw – dimodlaw; oriole; Oriulus chinensis
 Tamsi – sunbird;
 Tocmo
 iling
 maya
 Pabo – Turkey; Meleagris gallopavo
 itik – Pateros duck
 Pato – Muscovy duck
 Gansa – Geese
 Agila – Philippine eagle; Pithecophaga jefferyi
 Uwák – crow; Corone philippina
 uwák – Philippine crow; Corvus
 salampati or pati – dove
 Pigeon
 Alimokón
 Kuwagô – Philippine owl; Bubo bubo
 Manok bisaya – native chicken; Gallus gallus domesticus
 sunóy – rooster
 Manok ugís
 Philippine serpent eagle Spilornis holospilus
 brahminy kite
 woodpecker
 rocky-tailed blue-headed parrot
 grass owl
 scoop owl
 bubock pigeon
 water cock
 parakeets
 reel

Insects
 alibangbang – butterfly
 lamók – mosquito
 langaw – flies
  uk-ok – cockroach; ipis (Tag.)
 amigas or hulmigas – red ants; langgam (Tag.)
 sum – black ants (read soom)
 atitud – small ants
 anay – white ants
 aninipot – Fireflies
 don don or lukton – grasshopper
 buyóg or bujog – bees
 gangis – cricket
 beetle
 putyukan or putjukan – honey bees

Fish (Isdâ)

 andohaw 'mackerel fish'
 bakasí 'hawig'
 bakáy
 baksawan
 banák – family magulidae, mullet
 bangsi 'flying fish'
 bangús – milkfish;  Chanos chanos
 barilis – Neothunnus macropterus; yellowfin Tuna
 bawô 'needle fish'
 bolinaw – Encrasicholina oligobranchus; Philippine anchovy
 botete 'pupper fish'
 burot burot
 dalág – Ophicephalus striatus,   Murrel
 danggit – Siganid
 hasâ hasâ
 isdâ sa bató
 ketong [golden rabbit fish]
 kujóg
 lapulapu – Family Serranidae ; Grouper
 malasugí
 mansi
 molmol [parrot fish]
 pantat
 pómpano
 samín samín
 sugí
 sunghanunicorn fish'
 tambasakan
 tangigue
 tilapia – Tilapia; Tilapia zili
 tulingan frigged tuna 
 tuna
 blue marlin
 mackerel
 salmon
 silver sea bass – Lates calcarifer;
 Goby
 sea catfish – Family Ariidae
 labajan lupit wrasse – Family Labridae
 silver perch or therapon,  – Leiopotherapon plumbeus
 pakol 'queen triger fish'
 lapad-lapad
 budboron
 solid
 tagotongan porcupine fish
 dangit '[rabbit fish]'
Note:
 bijud sa isda – fish eggs: caviar
 sanga is banned
 tangkig – dwarf anaconda (sea)

Freshwater fish
 ibís – guppy
 kasili
 anga

Mollusks (Shellfish)

Univalves
 Saáng
 Chambered Nautilus
 bugyong
 buskay – cowry; Cypraea;  varieties: tiger cowry; golden cowry
 cones  – Conus

Bivalves
 bebe
 imbaw
 tuway
 aninikád
 dawo-dawo
 Amahóng or tahóng – green bay mussels Perna viridis  (affected by tide)
 oyster; Crassostrea gigas
 clams
 giant clams
 abalone
 scallops

Sea animals
 bóngcaras – sea cow
 iho – shark
 Whale shark; Rhincodon typus
 lumód – Dolphin;
 dugong – manatee; Dugong dugon 
 pawikan – sea turtle
 pague – manta ray
 bat or bat tulî – sea cucumber; Holothuria
 lambay – big Crabs
 kasag – small crabs
 agukoy – fiddler crab;  Uca sp.
 pasayan – sapayan; also sapajan;  shrimp
 lukón – prawn
 nukos – Squid;
 amûpô – Octopus;
 crabs – Genus Portunus
 nipâ nipâ – crablets
 sugâ sugâ – crablets
 Lobster
 Tangkigan
 Taklâ- crayfish
 Brittle stars; Ophiurida
 Sand dollars
 Starfish –   A. typicus
 tuyóm or tujóm – sea urchins; Diadema
 swakê –
 blue crab
 mud crab
 uwáng – Ustacidae, crayfish;
 uwáng – Macrobrachium rosenbergii, giant freshwater prawn
 sunlutan

Exotic species

 Kuhól – golden apple snail; Ampullaria cuprina

Gallery of Bohol Fauna

Gallery Philippine tarsier

References

External links
 Philippine Herbal Medicine Site
 Complete List of Herbal Medicinal Plants in Tagalog and English
 List of Philippine Herbal Medicinal Plants
 Philippine Invertebrates
 The Cave shrimps of the Philippines
 Primavera, J.H Philippine Mangroves: Status, Threats and Sustainable Development
 Vanishing treasures Retrieved February 1, 2007

Bohol flora and fauna
 
 
Bohol

ceb:Listahan sa mga tanom ug mananap sa Bohol